Portel Municipality may refer to:
Portel Municipality, Portugal
Portel, Pará, Brazil
Municipality name disambiguation pages